West Indies Squadron can refer to one of the following:

West Indies Squadron (United States), a United States Navy formation
North America and West Indies Station, a Royal Navy formation

See also
West India Squadron (disambiguation)